Penicillium raphiae is a species of fungus in the genus Penicillium which was isolated from agricultural soil of the Ulleung Island in Korea.

References

Further reading 
 

raphiae
Fungi described in 2011